Goran Stojiljković may refer to:

 Goran Stojiljković (footballer) (born 1970), Serbian retired footballer
 Goran Stojiljković (runner) (born 1979), Montenegrin marathon runner